Bayonville-sur-Mad (literally Bayonville on Mad) is a commune in the Meurthe-et-Moselle department in northeastern France.

Geography
The Rupt de Mad flows east through the middle of the commune and crosses the village.

Population

See also
Communes of the Meurthe-et-Moselle department
Parc naturel régional de Lorraine

References

Communes of Meurthe-et-Moselle